Nigina Sharipova (born 10 August 1995) is an Uzbekistani sprinter. She competed in the women's 100 metres event at the 2016 Summer Olympics. In 2017, she won the silver medal in the 100 and bronze in the 200 metres at the Islamic Solidarity Games in Baku, Azerbaijan. She also represented Uzbekistan in the 2017 Asian Indoor and Martial Arts Games competing in the Indoor athletics event.

In 2019, at the Asian Athletics Championships in Doha (Qatar), at a distance of 100 meters with a score of 11.41 seconds, she again took only fourth place, losing bronze to the Chinese Wei Yongli.

References

External links
 

1995 births
Living people
Uzbekistani female sprinters
Athletes (track and field) at the 2016 Summer Olympics
Athletes (track and field) at the 2018 Asian Games
Olympic athletes of Uzbekistan
People from Bukhara
Asian Games competitors for Uzbekistan
Islamic Solidarity Games competitors for Uzbekistan
Olympic female sprinters
21st-century Uzbekistani women